James Timothy Hardin (December 23, 1941 – December 29, 1980) was an American folk and blues musician and composer. As well as releasing his own material, several of his songs, including "If I Were a Carpenter" and "Reason to Believe", became hits for other artists.

Hardin grew up in Oregon and joined the Marine Corps. He started his music career in Greenwich Village which led to recording several albums in the mid- to late 1960s, and a performance at the Woodstock Festival. Hardin struggled with drug abuse throughout most of his adult life, and live performances were sometimes erratic. He was planning a comeback when he died in late 1980 from a heroin overdose.

Early life and career
Hardin was born in Eugene, Oregon to Hal Hardin and Molly, née Small, who both had musical training. His mother was an accomplished violinist who performed with the Portland Symphony Orchestra and his father, who worked at his wife's family's mill, had played bass in jazz bands. He attended South Eugene High School but  dropped out at age 18 to join the Marine Corps. Hardin is said to have discovered heroin while posted in Southeast Asia.

After his discharge he moved to New York City in 1961, where he briefly attended the American Academy of Dramatic Arts. He was eventually excluded for poor attendance and began to focus on his musical career by performing around Greenwich Village, playing folk and blues numbers. It was during this time that he became friends with "Mama Cass" Elliot, John Sebastian and Fred Neil.

After moving to Boston in 1963 he was discovered by the record producer Erik Jacobsen (later the producer for The Lovin' Spoonful), who arranged a meeting with Columbia Records. In 1964 he moved back to Greenwich Village to record for his contract with Columbia. The resulting recordings were not released and Columbia terminated Hardin's recording contract.

After moving to Los Angeles in 1965, he met actress Susan Yardley Morss (known professionally as Susan Yardley), and moved back to New York with her. He signed to the Verve Forecast label, and produced his first authorized album, Tim Hardin 1 in 1966 which contained "How Can We Hang On to a Dream", "Reason to Believe" and the ballad "Misty Roses", which received Top 40 radio play.

Tim Hardin 2 was released in 1967; it contained "If I Were a Carpenter". A British tour was cut short after Hardin contracted pleurisy.

An album entitled This is Tim Hardin, featuring covers of "House of the Rising Sun", Fred Neil's "Blues on the Ceiling" and Willie Dixon's "Hoochie Coochie Man", among others, appeared in 1967, on the Atco label. The liner notes indicate that the songs were recorded in 1963–1964, well prior to the release of Tim Hardin 1. In 1968, Verve released Tim Hardin 3 Live in Concert, a collection of live recordings along with re-makes of previous songs. It was followed by Tim Hardin 4, another collection of blues-influenced tracks believed to date from the same period as This is Tim Hardin. In September 1968 he and Van Morrison shared a bill at the Cafe Au Go Go, at which each performed an acoustic set.

In 1969, Hardin again signed with Columbia and had one of his few commercial successes, as a non-LP single of Bobby Darin's "Simple Song of Freedom" reached the US Top 50. Hardin did not tour in support of this single—his heroin use and stage fright made his live performances erratic.

Also in 1969 he appeared at the Woodstock Festival, where he sang "If I Were a Carpenter" solo and played a set of his music while backed by a full band. None of his performances were included in the documentary film or the original soundtrack album. His performance of "If I Were a Carpenter" was included on the 1994 box-set Woodstock: Three Days of Peace and Music.

He recorded three albums for Columbia—Suite for Susan Moore and Damion: We Are One, One, All in One; Bird on a Wire; and Painted Head.

Later work and death
During the following years Hardin moved between Britain and the U.S. In 1969 he arrived in England to take a programme for heroin addiction but this was unsuccessful and he became addicted to barbiturates which were used during the withdrawal stage from heroin. His heroin addiction had taken control of his life by the time his last album, Nine, was released on GM Records in the UK in 1973 (the album did not see a U.S. release until it appeared on Antilles Records in 1976). He sold the writers' rights to his songs, but accounts of how this transpired differ.

In late November 1975, Hardin performed as guest lead vocalist with the German experimental rock band Can, for two UK concerts at Hatfield Polytechnic in Hertfordshire and London's Drury Lane Theatre.  According to author Rob Young, in the book All Gates Open: The Story of Can, a huge argument between Hardin and Can occurred after the London concert, during which Hardin threw a television set through a car's windshield.

In early 1980, Hardin returned to the US after several years in Britain, and wrote ten new songs and started recording new material as a comeback. On December 29, he was found on the floor of his Hollywood apartment by longtime friend Ron Daniels. The police said there was no evidence of foul play and it appeared initially that the cause of death was a heart attack.  It was later confirmed by the Los Angeles coroner's office that Hardin had died of an accidental heroin overdose. His remains were buried in Twin Oaks Cemetery in Turner, Oregon. The new songs were included on the posthumous Unforgiven and the compilation The Shock of Grace.

Covers
Hardin wrote the Top 40 hit "If I Were a Carpenter," covered by, among others, Bobby Darin, Bob Dylan, Bob Seger, Joan Baez, Johnny Cash, The Four Tops, Robert Plant, Small Faces, Johnny Rivers, Bert Jansch, Willie Nelson, Sheryl Crow, Dolly Parton and Joe Nichols.  His song "Reason to Believe" has also been covered by many artists, notably Rod Stewart (who had a chart hit with the song), Neil Young, and The Carpenters. The Nice also recorded and performed live a popular version of Hardin's song "How Can We Hang On to a Dream" based on a piano arrangement by Keith Emerson. Morrissey covered "Lenny's Tune" on his 2019 album California Son.

Tributes and legacy
In 2005 the indie rock band Okkervil River released a concept studio album entitled Black Sheep Boy, said to be based on Hardin's life.  According to one reviewer, the tribute album  is a "collection that should go some way towards rekindling an interest in Hardin's life and work." Will Sheff from Okkervil River  said "there is something very disarming about how simple those songs are...a Tim Hardin song never outstays its welcome. It’s very short and pretty: one verse, one chorus, second verse, the song is over and he’s out of there. It’s like a tiny, perfectly cut gem."

Late in 2012 it was announced that a tribute album, Reason to Believe:The Songs of Tim Hardin featuring indie and alternative rock bands from Britain and America, was to be released in January 2013. Mark Lanegan, who sang the Hardin number Red Balloon on the album, told Rolling Stone: "I've always been haunted by his devastating voice and beautiful songs...I can’t imagine anyone hearing him and not feeling the same". Another performer on the album, Canadian singer-songwriter Ron Sexsmith, noted of Hardin [that]..."you get what he’s telling you without him spelling it out...when it came time to make my first record I can remember keeping that in mind." Initially the album is described on one music website as appearing "surprisingly mainstream,"  but later acknowledged in the article as  a "comprehensive package...[that]..transcends its limitations...[with the folkier songs]...capturing the fragility of Hardin’s original work without disrupting the moody, maudlin flow." The tribute album has also been described as providing an opportunity to focus more on Hardin's music than the issues with drugs and his early death.

Roger Daltrey chose Hardin's song "Dream" for his "commemorative CD of favorite music when he won the 2016 Music Industry Trusts Award for his services to music and charity...[noting in the CD track notes]...I was a huge fan of Tim."

On his third solo album recorded in 2015, Pete Sando, previously of the 1960s band Gandalf, included a song called "Misty Roses on a Stone" that he had co-written as a dedication to Hardin and said to be composed after a visit to the singer's grave.  He acknowledged that he been very influenced by Hardin, noting in particular..."his lyrical economy and musical balance...just the sheer simplicity and beauty of his songs was so appealing."

It has been reported that Bob Dylan said Hardin was "the greatest living songwriter" after hearing his first album. In a 1980 interview when asked about the Dylan quote Hardin recalled: "Yeah, I played him part of the album one night and he started flipping out, you know. Man, he got down on his knees in front of me and said: Don't change your singing style and don't bleep 'a' blop...."  In the same interview, Hardin did express some mixed feelings about Dylan, but in another article  Brian Millar concluded [that] "Dylan was right: for some years Tim Hardin was the greatest songwriter alive. And just as no one sang Dylan like Dylan, no one sings Hardin like Hardin." Hardin claimed to be either a distant relative of or direct descendent of John Wesley Hardin, a 19th-century outlaw, but this has been ascertained to be part of his self-mythologising; it has been said that this provided the inspiration for Dylan's album John Wesley Harding.

By 1967 after critical acclaim for his first album and the release of an earlier work entitled This is Tim Hardin, Hardin was in demand to tour Europe and the United States and his songs were being widely covered. However there was evidence of a decline in the quality of his work noted as being due in part to "his own combativeness in the studio, addiction to heroin, drinking problems, and frustration over his lack of commercial success," and he began to miss shows and perform poorly, reputedly falling asleep on stage at London's Royal Albert Hall in 1968. At the time he was viewed as enigmatic, with one journalist stating that while "his position as one of the best songwriters of his generation is unquestioned...[he]...courted the scene in the most fumbling manner imaginable." The same writer notes Hardin's ambivalent relationship with his audience, often ignoring them, just singing "at times badly, at times beautifully...somehow always fascinating." It has been written that Hardin did have an "uninspired stage presence" in spite of having what the reporter said was "not a bad voice."

After his death in 1980, there was considerable reflective journalism about his impact. It was reported that, along with Leonard Cohen, Hardin was the only musician who could rival Bob Dylan in composing "deeply moving love songs," however the critic also noted that Hardin never gained the attention he deserved and when found dead, not one of his albums was still in print. Jon Marlow writing in the Miami News said he was not about to "glorify yet another dead junkie's lifestyle" but held that the Tim Hardin Memorial album is an "unheralded but still beautiful record of 12 songs that deserve your attention and money...has nothing to do with dead-hero worship...it's simply here to remind us that via his first two albums Tim Hardin made a lot of promises he couldn't keep." Another reviewer wrote of the memorial album that it "firmly establishes Hardin as an enduring and influential artist." The excesses of his lifestyle came under scrutiny and while it was never concluded whether he was a jazz rather than a folk artist, one reviewer noted that "few people who have never heard the poignant, often lonely, tone of [his] body of work would dispute the suggestion that he was one of the most affecting singer-songwriters of the modern pop era." It was said in the Los Angeles Weekly that Hardin's life showed drugs, alcohol and creativity were not a long-lasting or positive partnership, with the writer concluding: "I don't think Tim Hardin was ever really sure how good he was, and he rocketed from arrogance to despair conscious of the promises he couldn't keep..[he is]...gone, but the songs aren't and they will last."

Discography 
Tim Hardin 1 (1966)
Tim Hardin 2 (1967)
This Is Tim Hardin (1967)
Tim Hardin 3 Live in Concert (1968)
Tim Hardin 4 (1969)
Suite for Susan Moore and Damion: We Are One, One, All in One (1969)
Bird on a Wire (1971)
Painted Head (1972)
Nine (1973)
Unforgiven (1981)

References

External links

 
 Detailed fan site
 Woodstock performance--If I Were a Carpenter

1941 births
1980 deaths
American male composers
20th-century American composers
American expatriates in the United Kingdom
American folk singers
American male singer-songwriters
Musicians from Eugene, Oregon
Deaths by heroin overdose in California
Drug-related deaths in California
American folk guitarists
American acoustic guitarists
Turner, Oregon
South Eugene High School alumni
Atco Records artists
20th-century American singers
Singer-songwriters from Oregon
Columbia Records artists
American pianists
Verve Records artists
Guitarists from Oregon
20th-century American guitarists
American male pianists
American male guitarists
20th-century American male singers
20th-century American pianists